The Moawhango River is a tributary of the Rangitīkei River and is located the central North Island of New Zealand.

Course
The dam was constructed to divert some water from the river for the Tongariro Power Scheme, while some is released to continue down the Moawhango River. This lower section of the river flows through steep sided gorges making it difficult to access.

Dam
Construction of the Moawhango River dam (known as Lake Moawhango) began in 1972 and was completed several years later. It forms part of the Tongariro Power Scheme with the water being diverted to the Rangipo power station. In 2008 complaints were made about impact of the diversion of water from the river, particularly silt build-up.

Gallery

Fishing
The river is noted for its predominantly brown and rainbow trout.

See also
List of rivers of New Zealand

References

Rivers of Manawatū-Whanganui
Rivers of New Zealand